Sobhan Babu appeared in 230 movies between 1959 and 1996. In almost 200 of those, he acted in a leading role. The following is a list of the films in which he appeared. He made his two Kannada appearance in a guest role in 1962 film Mahathma Kabir and Shivaratri Mahathme (1964) both starring Kannada actor Rajkumar.

References

External links
 
 http://digg.com/people/Shoban_Babu_Filmography_Films_list_Telugu_films_list_profile

Indian filmographies
Male actor filmographies